Fattatenda  is a small village in eastern Gambia on the Gambia River. It is located in Wuli District in the Upper River Divisiont, a few kilometers southwest of the much larger village of Baja Kunda.  As of 2009, it has an estimated population of 49. 

In 1829, the King of Wuli ceded Fattatenda to the British administrator William Hutton, but the agreement was later repudiated by the British government and Hutton was dismissed. Still, Fattatenda was the main upriver entrepot for trade on the Gambia river, exchanging cloth and guns for gold and ivory coming from Bundu to the east. It was thereby linked to the French fort and trading post of Bakel on the Senegal River and the Trans-Saharan caravan routes. The ruins of commercial buildings are still visible today.

References

Populated places in the Gambia
Upper River Division
The Gambia–United Kingdom relations